Leave Luck to Heaven is the first studio album by Matthew Dear. It was released on Spectral Sound, a sub-label of Ghostly International, in 2003.

Critical reception

Andy Kellman of AllMusic gave the album 4.5 stars out of 5, saying, "Formatted like a pop record intended for home listening, with most tracks falling somewhere in the four- to five-minute range, Leave Luck to Heaven has a flow unlike any other single-artist microhouse album to date." Scott Plagenhoef of Pitchfork gave the album a 7.8 out of 10, calling it "his most satisfying release to date" and "(along with Ricardo Villalobos' Alcachofa) another techno-dub record that deftly straddles the line between home listening and the dancefloor."

Track listing

Personnel
Credits adapted from liner notes.

 Matthew Dear – production
 SV4 – executive production
 Rashad – mastering
 Michael Doyle – design
 Will Calcutt – photography

References

External links
 

2003 debut albums
Matthew Dear albums
Microhouse albums
Ghostly International albums